Battaristis concisa is a moth of the family Gelechiidae. It was described by Edward Meyrick in 1929. It is found in Cuba.

References

Battaristis
Taxa named by Edward Meyrick
Moths described in 1929
Endemic fauna of Cuba